The Odyssey Mixtape is the first mixtape album by dancehall artist Sean Paul, released four months after his fourth studio album, Imperial Blaze (2009). It is entirely self-produced by Paul. The image used for the album cover is a slightly modified reversed version of the one on the back of the Imperial Blaze album.

Track listing

Samples 
"Odyssey Intro" 
"Intro: Chi Ching Ching" by Sean Paul.
"We Party" 
"Gangsta Luv" by Snoop Dogg.
"Bring It On" 
"D.O.A. (Death of Auto-Tune)" by Jay-Z.
"Forever" 
"Forever" by Drake featuring Kanye West, Lil Wayne and Eminem.
"Run This Town (I'm Dangerous)" 
"Run This Town" by Jay-Z featuring Rihanna and Kanye West.
"Blazin'"
"Imma Star" by Jeremih
"Red In Dem Eyes"
"Who's Real" Ft. Swiss Beatz, OJ Da Juiceman by Jadakiss.

References

Sean Paul albums
2011 mixtape albums